Gentian Lulani, better known as Gentian (Shkoder, 1 December 1972) is an Albanian artist.

Biography 

Gentian Lulani was born in Shkoder, Albania in 1972. He grew up surrounded by the paintings of his uncle, one of the most celebrated artists in Albania, the great master Ismail Lulani. The paintings, sketches, studies, and books around him, encouraged Gentian to start drawing and painting at only 10 years old.

Later, he enrolled in the secondary School of Arts (Prenke Jakova) in his hometown of Shkoder and continued his studies in the Academy of Fine Arts in Tirana. At the age of 18 he went on to study Art in Rome. The 10 years he spent in Rome after his studies were thoroughly dedicated to the art of painting and to the intensive study of masterpieces from the Renaissance old masters. As well as his school studies, Gentian took private lessons with old masters in Rome and Florence.

After his move to Ireland in 2000, Gentian completed an Honours Degree in Art and Art History and Master in Fine Art at the Crawford College of Art and Design in Cork. Afterwards, he opened a studio and gallery on the grounds of Ballymaloe House in County Cork. His work has been exhibited successfully in solo and collective exhibitions throughout Ireland and mainland Europe. In 2006, he was accepted by the BP Awards of the National Portrait Gallery in London.

Education 

Shkolla e Mesme Artistike "Prenke Jakova" Shkoder, Albania 1991
Academia delle Belle Arte di Roma, Rome, Italy 1998
BA Fine Art, Painting, Crawford College of Art and Design, Cork, Ireland 2006
MA Master in Fine Art Crawford College of Art and Design, Cork, Ireland 2015

Work 

Gentian's art is focused on portraits, landscapes and drawings. He is inspired by the Pre-Raphaelite brotherhood and most of his female portraits have an idyllic and dreamy expression, set on abstract backgrounds which often dictate mystery.
His landscapes have been influenced mostly by his uncle's work but also the great master, Camille Corot, has had a huge impact on him since he was 13 years old. The artist is into mythology and symbolism as well, on some of his illustrations, drawings and compositions.

His painting process is influenced by life, memory and photography as well: All portraits are people that he knows and all landscapes are places he has visited. Also the theme of migration appears in some of Gentian's works, due to the fact he has felt it on a personal level. These works express hope and tie migration in with nature and earth.

Gentian is an artist on move. He likes to explore himself in different ways through its art, always trying to bring something new and refreshing to his art lovers. He believes change is what keeps an artist alive and allows him to introduce to the others, his inner colorful world.

Exhibitions 

National Portrait Gallery, London, United Kingdom (2006)
Royal Academy of Arts, London, United Kingdom (2006)
National Portrait Gallery, Scotland (2007)
Parliament of Austria, Vienna, Austria (2011)
Royal Hibernian Academy, Dublin, Ireland (2013)

External links 

DC INTERVIEW: Gentian Lulani
und Zeichnungen von Gentian Lulani im Hohen Haus Bundesratspräsident Kneifel lud zur Ausstellungseröffnung
Gentian: Portrait of an artist
Gentian Lulani: One artist's story of migration
Gentian Lulani Gallery
of Myrtle: The face of irish cooking
http://www.thetimes.co.uk/article/visual-art-bp-portrait-award-at-the-national-portrait-gallery-fxpp865zg

1972 births
Living people
University of Arts (Albania) alumni
People from Shkodër
Alumni of Cork Institute of Technology